Pas Kalut Rural District is a rural district (dehestan) in the Central District of Gonabad County, Razavi Khorasan Province, Iran. At the 2006 census, its population was 8,762, in 2,256 families.  The rural district has 22 villages.

References 

Rural Districts of Razavi Khorasan Province
Gonabad County